Home Office radio was the VHF and UHF radio service provided by the British government to its prison service, emergency service (police, ambulance and fire brigade) and Home Defence agencies from around 1939. The departmental name was the Home Office Directorate of Telecommunications, commonly referred to as DTELS.

Prior to this, contact by emergency service personnel with their control rooms was made by telephone. Then in 1922 the Metropolitan Police began to install radio receivers in their vehicles. Due to telegraphy only being one way, take up was slow. By the 1970s most police and fire services had their own dedicated radio setups, and personal radios (referred to as PRs) were beginning to be rolled out to the police in most towns and cities. Home Office radio was furthered towards the end of the Cold War, with having a communications network that was independent of the then Post Office deemed a necessity should Britain come under attack from nuclear weapons.

Radio schemes run by DTELS consisted of ten wireless depots throughout England, Scotland and Wales, supplemented further by around sixty outstations. Ten regions were designated along the same regional boundaries as the Home Defence were, and within each region was a wireless telegraph station. The Home Office allocated four-character call signs beginning with M2 to every police and fire service, with respective control rooms starting and ending every transmission with said call sign. An oddity of the system was that call signs were often spoken as letters rather than phonetically: "MP" would be said as "Em-Pee" rather than "Mike Papa". This varied between regions.

Regions 
England - Regions 2 to 10 excluding 8,

Scotland - Region 1,

Wales - Region 8.

Police radio codes

Airwave 
In 1991 the Directorate of Telecommunications officially changed its name to DTELS and four years later became a private sector company following a trade sale to National Transcommunications Limited (NTL).

By the last quarter of 2006 police forces had migrated radio networks from the UHF frequencies to TeTRa on the Airwave network, followed by ambulance services in 2007 and fire services in 2010. Airwave now has a nationwide network of more than 3,000 sites and provides secure voice and data communications to over 300 public safety organisations.

References 

Home Office (United Kingdom)